Hun Sen Cup, the main football knockout tournament in Cambodia.The 2013 Hun Sen Cup is the 7th season of the Hun Sen Cup, the premier knockout tournament for association football clubs in Cambodia involving Cambodian League and provincial teams organized by the Football Federation of Cambodia.

Preah Khan Reach were the defending champions, having beaten Nagacorp FC 2–1 in the previous season's final.

Qualifying round

Group stage
The teams finishing in the top two positions in each of the four groups (highlighted in tables) in group stage progressed to the quarter-finals.

Group A

Group B

Group C

Group D

Quarter-finals

Semi-finals

Third place play-off

Final

Awards
 Top goal scorer (The golden boot): Chan Vathanaka of Boeung Ket Rubber Field (11 goals)
 Goalkeeper of the season (The golden glove): Phorn Ratana of Nagaworld FC
 The player of the season: Choun Chum of Nagaworld FC
 Fair Play: Phnom Penh Crown FC

See also
 2013 Cambodian League
 Cambodian League
 Hun Sen Cup

References

Hun Sen Cup seasons
2013 in Cambodian football
2013 domestic association football cups